Danny Flynn (born September 5, 1957) is a Canadian  ice hockey coach for the Saint John Sea Dogs of the QMJHL. He was most recently an assistant coach for the Buffalo Sabres. Previously, he was an assistant coach with the New York Islanders during the 2006–07 NHL season.

Flynn was the Assistant Coach of the Sault Ste. Marie Greyhounds of the Ontario Hockey League in 1993 when the team won the Memorial Cup under head coach Ted Nolan.

Flynn coached  the St. Francis Xavier University men's ice hockey team to the CIS national championship in 2003-04. Between 2007 and 2013, Flynn served as the head coach and general manager for the Moncton Wildcats of the QMJHL where he twice lead the Wildcats to capture the QMJHL championships.

Awards and honours

References

External links
Danny Flynn's staff ptofile at Eliteprospects.com

1957 births
Living people
Buffalo Sabres coaches
Columbus Blue Jackets scouts
Ice hockey people from Nova Scotia
Los Angeles Kings scouts
National Hockey League assistant coaches
New York Islanders coaches
Saint John Sea Dogs coaches
Sportspeople from Dartmouth, Nova Scotia